Vithala R. Rao is the Deane Malott Professor of Management and Professor of Marketing and Quantitative Methods at Samuel Curtis Johnson Graduate School of Management, Cornell University. He is known for his work on marketing research, conjoint analysis and multidimensional scaling. He is a Fellow of the American Marketing Association.

Books
Applied Conjoint Analysis, 2014
Applied Multidimensional Scaling: A Comparison of Alternative Approaches and Algorithms, (with P.E. Green), New York: Holt, Rinehart and Winston, Inc., 1972.

Selected research publications
Rao, Vithala R., Manoj K. Agarwal, and Denise Dahlhoff. "How is manifest branding strategy related to the intangible value of a corporation?." Journal of Marketing 68, no. 4 (2004): 126-141
Chung, J. and Rao, V.R., 2003. A general choice model for bundles with multiple-category products: Application to market segmentation and optimal pricing for bundles. Journal of Marketing Research, 40(2), pp. 115–130.
Rao, Vithala R., and Darius Jal Sabavala. "Inference of hierarchical choice processes from panel data." Journal of Consumer Research 8, no. 1 (1981): 85-96.
Green, Paul E., and Vithala R. Rao. "Conjoint measurement for quantifying judgmental data." Journal of Marketing research (1971): 355-363.
Green, Paul E., and Vithala R. Rao. "Rating scales and information recovery. How many scales and response categories to use?." The Journal of Marketing (1970): 33-39.

References

Living people
Cornell University faculty
Fellows of the American Marketing Association
Year of birth missing (living people)
University of Michigan alumni